Venus Williams was the defending champion, but chose not to participate that year.

Maria Kirilenko won in the final 2–6, 6–1, 6–4, against Samantha Stosur.

Seeds

Draw

Finals

Top half

Bottom half

External links
Draw and Qualifying draw

Korea Open (tennis)
Hansol Korea Open